Alopoglossus andeanus is a species of lizard in the family Alopoglossidae. It is endemic to Peru.

References

Alopoglossus
Reptiles of Peru
Endemic fauna of Peru
Reptiles described in 1952
Taxa named by Rodolfo Ruibal